Kantapat Koonmee (born 17 April 1998) is a member of the Thailand men's national volleyball team.

Clubs 
  Chonburi (2014–2016)
  Air force (2016–2020)
  Diamond Food VC. (2020–2022)
  Oita Miyoshi Weisse Adler (2022–Present)

Awards

Individual
 MVP,  2016 SEA Men's U20 Championships
 2017 Thai-Denmark Super League "Best Scorer"
 2017–18 Thailand League "Best Outside Spiker"
 2018 Thai-Denmark Super League "Best Spiker"
 2018–19 Thailand League "Most Valuable Player"
 2018–19 Thailand League "Best Outside Spiker"

Clubs 
 2015–16 Thailand League -  Bronze Medal, with Chonburi E-Tech Air Force
 2016–17 Thailand League -  Champion, with Air Force
 2017 Thai–Denmark Super League -  Runner-up, with Air Force
 2017–18 Thailand League -  Champion, with Air Force
 2018 Thai–Denmark Super League -  Champion, with Air Force
 2017–18 Thailand League -  Champion, with Air Force
 2019 Thai–Denmark Super League -  Runner-Up, with Air Force

References

1998 births
Living people
Kantapat Koonmee
Kantapat Koonmee
Thai expatriate sportspeople in Japan
Expatriate volleyball players in Japan
Kantapat Koonmee
Southeast Asian Games medalists in volleyball
Competitors at the 2017 Southeast Asian Games
Volleyball players at the 2018 Asian Games
Competitors at the 2019 Southeast Asian Games
Kantapat Koonmee
Opposite hitters
Kantapat Koonmee